Evan Lloyd (died 1587), of Bodidris, Llanarmon yn Iâl, Denbighshire, was a Welsh politician.

He was the eldest son of John Lloyd.

He was a Justice of the Peace for Denbighshire  from 1575, for Flintshire from 1579 and for Merioneth from 1583. He was appointed High Sheriff of Denbighshire for 1582-83 and custos rotulorum of Denbighshire from 1575.

He was elected a Member (MP) of the Parliament of England for Denbighshire in 1584. In 1586 Lloyd, a fervent Protestant, fought for the Dutch under the Earl of Leicester.

He died in London the following year on his way home, having been made a knight banneret. He was buried in his native parish on 3 March 1587. He had married Elizabeth, the daughter of Thomas Mostyn of Mostyn, Flintshire and the widow of John Wyn Iâl of Plas yn Iâl. They had a son, John, and a daughter.

Notes

References
 

Year of birth missing
1587 deaths
16th-century Welsh politicians
Members of the Parliament of England for Denbighshire
Members of the Parliament of England (pre-1707) for constituencies in Wales
High Sheriffs of Denbighshire
English MPs 1584–1585
Knights banneret of England